Georgia Bright Engel (July 28, 1948 – April 12, 2019) was an American actress. She is best known for having played Georgette Franklin Baxter in the sitcom The Mary Tyler Moore Show from 1972 to 1977, Pat MacDougall on Everybody Loves Raymond from 2003 to 2005 and Mamie Sue on Hot in Cleveland from 2012 to 2015  She was nominated for five Primetime Emmy Awards.

Early life
Georgia Engel was born in Washington, D.C., the daughter of Ruth Caroline (née Hendron) and Benjamin Franklin Engel, who was a Vice Admiral in the United States Coast Guard. Engel attended the Kodiak Island Borough School District, Walter Johnson High School, and the Academy of the Washington Ballet from which she graduated. She earned her theater degree from the University of Hawaii at Manoa.

Career

After college, Engel appeared in musical productions with Washington's American Light Opera Company. She moved to New York City in 1969, appearing off-Broadway in Lend an Ear, and for a year as Minnie Fay in the Broadway production of Hello, Dolly!, starting in December 1969. A 1971 off-Broadway production of The House of Blue Leaves eventually played in Los Angeles, where Engel was seen by Mary Tyler Moore and her husband, producer Grant Tinker, her soon-to-be employers.

Engel portrayed the character Georgette on The Mary Tyler Moore Show from 1972 until the sitcom ended in 1977. The role won her two Emmy nominations. After that sitcom ended, she teamed up with former Mary Tyler Moore Show co-star Betty White for The Betty White Show during its only (1977–78) season. She later co-starred on two short-lived 1980s sitcoms, Goodtime Girls as Loretta Smoot, and in Jennifer Slept Here featuring Ann Jillian.

Engel had a recurring role on Coach as Shirley Burleigh and starred as the voice of Love-a-Lot Bear in The Care Bears Movie (1985). She played a good witch in a 2007 recurring role of Esmeralda on the now-defunct NBC soap opera Passions. Engel received consecutive Emmy Award nominations as outstanding guest actress in a comedy series in 2003, 2004, and 2005 for her role on Everybody Loves Raymond as Robert Barone's mother-in-law, Pat MacDougall. She also played Cassie Wilson on two episodes of Neighbours.

Engel made her "big screen" debut in Miloš Forman's first English-language movie Taking Off (1971), playing "Margot", a performance that earned her a BAFTA nomination for best supporting actress. Her other film appearances include The Outside Man (1973), Papa Was a Preacher (1987), Signs of Life (1989),The Sweetest Thing (2002), and the made-for-TV movies The Day the Women Got Even (1980) and A Love Affair: The Eleanor and Lou Gehrig Story (1978).

She lent her distinctive voice to the animated films Open Season (2006), Open Season 2 (2008), Open Season 3 (2010) and Dr. Dolittle 2 (2001).

Engel returned to her stage roots in 2006, appearing on Broadway in the musical The Drowsy Chaperone, with Sutton Foster and Edward Hibbert. She created the role of Mrs. Tottendale, which she continued to perform, leaving the Broadway production as of April 1, 2007.<ref>Jones, Kenneth. Lovely in the End: Georgia Engel Exits Drowsy Chaperone April 1 "Lovely in the End: Georgia Engel Exits Drowsy Chaperone' April 1"] playbill.com, April 1, 2007</ref> She was featured in the North American tour, performing in Toronto in September 2007, through engagements at the Orpheum Theater in San Francisco, in August 2008, and at the Denver Performing Arts Complex in October 2008.

For the summers of 2004, 2005, 2007, 2009, and 2010, Engel appeared in various productions at The Muny Theater in Forest Park in St. Louis, Missouri. She also appeared in Show Boat in August 2010 as Parthy. In July 2005, she appeared in Mame as Agnes Gooch, in June 2007, she appeared in Oklahoma! as Aunt Eller, and in July 2009, she appeared as Mrs. Paroo in The Music Man.

In June 2010, Engel appeared at the Ogunquit Playhouse in Ogunquit, Maine, production of The Drowsy Chaperone as Mrs. Tottendale. In October through December 2010, Engel was featured in the Vineyard Theatre's off-Broadway production of Middletown, written by Will Eno." 'Middletown' Listing" vineyard.com, accessed August 3, 2015

In 2012, she appeared in episodes of The Office as Irene, an older lady being helped by Erin Hannon (Ellie Kemper). She also appeared in two episodes of Two and a Half Men as the mother of Lyndsey McElroy, Alan's girlfriend. The character would also become a lesbian lover of Alan's mom, Evelyn.  In March 2012, 35 years after the close of The Mary Tyler Moore Show, Engel was reunited with Betty White in the third season of Hot in Cleveland as Mamie Sue Johnson, best friend of White's character Elka, in a recurring role.

Engel appeared in the new Annie Baker play John, which opened off-Broadway at the Signature Theatre on July 22, 2015 (previews), directed by Sam Gold. The play ran to September 6, 2015. The cast also featured Lois Smith. Engel won a 2016 Obie Award for Distinguished Performance by an Actress and was nominated for the 2016 Lucille Lortel Award, Outstanding Lead Actress in a Play for her role in this play.

Engel starred in the musical Gotta Dance, which premiered at the Bank of America Theatre, Chicago on December 13, 2015, and ran until January 17, 2016. The cast also featured Stefanie Powers, Lillias White, and André De Shields. The musical was directed and choreographed by Jerry Mitchell, with a book by Chad Beguelin and Bob Martin, and the score by Matthew Sklar and Nell Benjamin. The musical, under the new title of Half Time, played a limited engagement at the Paper Mill Playhouse in Millburn, New Jersey. The production opened on May 31, 2018, and was scheduled to run to July 1, 2018.

Personal life and death
Engel was an adherent of Christian Science. She died on April 12, 2019, at the age of 70 in Princeton, New Jersey. Her friend John Quilty told The New York Times'' that the cause was unknown, as Engel did not consult doctors due to her religious beliefs. She was buried at Cape Charles Cemetery, in Cape Charles, Virginia.

Filmography

Film

Television

References

External links
 
 
 
 
 
 New York Times biography
 

1948 births
2019 deaths
American film actresses
American voice actresses
American television actresses
Actresses from Hawaii
University of Hawaiʻi at Mānoa alumni
Actresses from Washington, D.C.
20th-century American actresses
21st-century American actresses
American Christian Scientists